Kovur may refer to:

Kovvur, West Godavari district, a town in West Godavari district, Andhra Pradesh, India
Kovur, Nellore district, a town  in Nellore district, Andhra Pradesh, India
Kovur, Prakasam district, a village in Prakasam district, Andhra Pradesh, India
Kovur, Chennai, a town in Kanchipuram district, Tamil Nadu India